Bob Greenwood may refer to:

Bob Greenwood (baseball) (1928–1994), Mexican baseball player
Bob Greenwood (footballer) (born 1947), Australian rules footballer